At least 15 special routes of U.S. Route 78 have existed.

Mississippi

Red Banks business loop

Hickory Flat business loop

Alabama

Hamilton–Graysville alternate route

Carbon Hill–Jasper alternate route

Birmingham–Irondale alternate route

Birmingham truck route

Leeds truck route

Anniston business loop

Alabama–Georgia

US 78N 

U.S. Route 78N (US 78N) was a northern divided U.S. highway that comprised the current mainline of US 78 from Heflin, Alabama, to Villa Rica, Georgia.

The road that would eventually become US 78N was established in 1920, as SR 8 from the Alabama state line to Villa Rica. By the end of the third quarter of 1926, US 78 was established, being designated along a local roadway from Heflin to the state line, and SR 8 from the state line to Villa Rica. The next year, US 78 split into two divided routes, with US 78N being designated from Heflin to Villa Rica, on the northern segment of SR 8 (thereby replacing the mainline highway). In 1928, Alabama State Route 4 (SR-4) was designated along US-78N. By May 1933, US 78N/SR 8 were paved from Bremen to Villa Rica. Later that month, US 78N/SR 8 were paved from east of the Alabama state line to Bremen. The next month, US 78N/SR 8 were paved west to the Alabama state line. By November 1934, US 78N was redesignated as part of mainline US 78.

US 78S 

U.S. Route 78S (US 78S) was a southern divided U.S. highway that comprised the current length of Alabama State Route 46 from Heflin, Alabama, to the Georgia state line, SR 166 from the state line to Carrollton, and SR 61 from Carrollton to Villa Rica.

The road that would eventually become US 78 was established in 1920 as part of SR 34 from Carrollton to Villa Rica. By the end of the third quarter of 1921, SR 16 was designated from the Alabama state line, west of Bowdon to Carrollton. By late 1926, SR 16 and SR 34 were redesignated as a southern branch of SR 8. In 1927, US 78 split into two divided routes, with US 78S being designated from Heflin to Villa Rica, via Bowdon and Carrollton, on the southern branch of SR 8. In 1928, Alabama State Route 4 (SR-4) was designated along US-78N, while SR-46 was designated along US-78S. By 1932, US 78S/SR 8 were paved from Carrollton to just southwest of Villa Rica. By the end of 1934, US 78S/SR 8 were paved from the Alabama state line to a point near Bowdon. By November 1934, US 78S was redesignated as US 78 Alternate. By the beginning of 1948, the southern branch of SR 8 was redesignated as SR 8 Alternate. By the middle of 1954, SR 8 Alternate was redesignated as SR 166 from the Alabama state line to northeast of Carrollton) and SR 61 from there to Villa Rica.

Heflin–Villa Rica alternate route

U.S. Route 78 Alternate (US 78 Alt.) was an alternate route of US 78 in northeast Alabama and northwest Georgia. It comprised the current length of Alabama State Route 46 (SR 46) from Heflin, Alabama, to the Georgia state line, SR 166 from the state line to Carrollton, and SR 61 from Carrollton to Villa Rica.

The road that would eventually become US 78 Alternate was established in 1920 as part of SR 34 from Carrollton to Villa Rica. By the end of the third quarter of 1921, SR 16 was designated from the Alabama state line, west of Bowdon to Carrollton. By late 1926, SR 16 and SR 34 were redesignated as a southern branch of SR 8. In 1927, US 78 split into two divided routes, with US 78S being designated from Heflin to Villa Rica, via Bowdon and Carrollton, on the southern branch of SR 8. In 1928, SR 4 was designated along US-78N, while SR 46 was designated along US-78S. By 1932, US 78S/SR 8 were paved from Carrollton to just southwest of Villa Rica. By the end of 1934, US 78S/SR 8 were paved from the Alabama state line to a point near Bowdon. By November 1934, US 78S was redesignated as US 78 Alt. By the beginning of 1948, the southern branch of SR 8 was redesignated as SR 8 Alternate. By the beginning of 1953, US 78 Alt. was decommissioned. SR 8 Alternate became SR 166 from the Alabama state line to northeast of Carrollton by the middle of 1954, and SR 61 from there to Villa Rica.

Georgia

Athens business loop

U.S. Route 78 Business (US 78 Bus.) in the Athens – Clarke County metropolitan area is a Bannered U.S. Highway that is concurrent with Georgia State Route 10 (SR 10) for its entire length. Its western terminus is at an interchange with US 29/SR 8/SR 316 and US 78/SR 10, southeast of Bogart in Oconee County. Its eastern terminus is at US 29/US 78/US 129/US 441/SR 8/SR 10 Loop/SR 15. The roadway continues as US 78/SR 10.

All of US 78 Bus. in Clarke County is included as part of the National Highway System, a system of roadways important to the nation's economy, defense, and mobility.

Prior to the completion of the Athens Perimeter Highway, and SR 316, the Broad Street and Atlanta Highway portions of US 78 Business carried US 29/US 78 through Athens' downtown and commercial west side. US 29 entered Athens via North Avenue and Thomas Street, joining US 78 at the Broad Street–Thomas Street–Oconee Street intersection downtown. The combined highways continued to the Pepsi bottling plant in Bogart, where US 78 turned left onto the Moina Michael Highway and US 29 continued straight into Bogart.

When SR 10 Loop was completed, US 29 was routed along the north side of the loop, while US 78 was routed along the south side, with US 78 Bus. being established inside the loop. North Avenue and Thomas Street had their state route designation removed. SR 316 (also carrying US 29) had been completed only up to Moina Michael Highway, so the stretch of highway from there to SR 10 Loop (sections of Moina Michael Highway and Atlanta Highway) continued to carry US 29/US 78. Once SR 316 was completed to SR 10 Loop, US 29/US 78 were moved to SR 316, and US 29 was switched from the north side of the loop to the south side of the loop while US 78 Bus. was extended over Atlanta Highway and Moina Michael Highway to its present state. (Some maps still show US 29 along the north side of SR 10 Loop but that is incorrect; all signage is consistent with US 29 being routed on the south and east sides of the loop.)

Washington business loop

U.S. Route 78 Business (US 78 Bus.) is a  business route of US 78 that exists entirely within the south-central part of Wilkes County. Nearly its entire length is within the city limits of Washington. It is concurrent with State Route 10 Business (SR 10 Bus.) for its entire length.

The concurrency begins at an intersection with US 78/SR 10, northwest of Washington. The business routes are known as Lexington Avenue. They travel to the southeast until they enter the city limits; then, they curve to the east-southeast. Just past Recreation Drive, they enter the Washington Historic District. They intersect SR 44 (North Mercer Street). At the eastern terminus of Callow Drive, US 78 Bus./SR 10 Bus. curve to an east-southeast direction and are known as West Robert Toombs Avenue, named for Robert Toombs, a U.S. Representative and senator from Georgia, as well as a Confederate general and Confederate Secretary of State. At Depot Street, they are about one block north of the northern terminus of the Georgia Woodlands Railroad line. Spring Street marks the beginning of a concurrency with SR 47. Between Spring Street and Cheney Parkway, the three highways pass by the town square. At the corner of East Liberty Street, they pass by the historic Washington Presbyterian Church, just before passing the Robert Toombs House. A short distance later, they intersect SR 17 Bus. (Poplar Street), which joins the concurrency. Immediately after that intersection, the four highways curve to the southeast and pass the Washington–Wilkes Historical Museum. US 78 Bus./SR 10 Bus./SR 17 Bus./SR 47 intersect East Street, which leads to Washington–Wilkes Elementary School. They continue to the southeast, before intersecting US 78/US 378/SR 10/SR 17. At this intersection, US 78 Bus./SR 10 Bus./SR 17 Bus. end, while SR 47 continues, concurrent with the beginning of US 378 (Lincolnton Road). US 78 Bus. is not part of the National Highway System, a system of roadways important to the nation's economy, defense, and mobility.

In 1970, US 78 and SR 10 were routed along SR 10 Loop in the northern part of Washington, with the former routing becoming US 78 Bus. (and presumably SR 10 Bus.). In 1986, SR 10 Loop was decommissioned.

South Carolina

Aiken truck route

U.S. Route 78 Truck (US 78 Truck) is a truck route of US 78 that bypasses north of downtown Aiken, via University Parkway and Rudy Mason Parkway. Its routing is in complete concurrency with US 1 Truck, and it is also concurrent with other truck routes from U.S. and state highways. The highway is two-lane on both ends, with four-lane stretches between Laurens Street and Willow Run Road and between Old Wagener Road and Charleston Highway. Though the routing is longer than going through the downtown area, it does provide a faster connection with US 1.

Blackville business loop

U.S. Route 78 Business (US 78 Bus.) is a short business loop in the central part of the town of Blackville, via Walker and Main Streets. Even though it is signed west of South Carolina Highway 3 (SC 3; Solomon Blatt Avenue), the South Carolina Department of Transportation only includes the portion east of SC 3 as part of the business route. Originally, US 78 traversed along the route until by 1967, when new road south was created, allowing it to bypass Main Street.  The old alignment was not made into a business route till at least 1981; however, though it is signed as a business loop, on state and county maps it is officially a connector route in disguise.

Bamberg County connector route

U.S. Route 78 Connector (US 78 Conn.) is a short connector route in the southeastern part of Bamberg County. It connects South Carolina Highway 61 (SC 61), at a point just southeast of its northern terminus, with US 78.

See also

References

 
78
U.S. Highways in Mississippi
U.S. Highways in Alabama
U.S. Highways in Georgia (U.S. state)
U.S. Highways in South Carolina